Laís Ribeiro (born Laís Pereira de Oliveira; 5 October 1989) is a Brazilian model  known for her work as a Victoria's Secret Angel.

Career
Prior to becoming a model, Ribeiro was in training to become a nurse. A year after giving birth to her son Alexandre, she gave in to a friend's advice and started working as a model in her native Brazil. In 2009, she walked the major international catwalks for such designers as Shiatzy Chen, Chanel, Louis Vuitton, Gucci, Dolce & Gabbana, Versace, DKNY, Dior, Roberto Cavalli, Blumarine, Moschino, Balmain, Jean Paul Gaultier, Alexandre Vauthier, Elie Saab, Alexander Wang, Guy Laroche, and Marc Jacobs, amongst others. During the fashion week of Brazil for the spring/summer 2011 collections, Ribeiro was the most booked runway model with 27 shows during São Paulo Fashion Week and 26 shows during Rio Fashion Week.

She has been photographed for American, Brazilian, German, and Italian Vogue, and appeared in ad campaigns for Ralph Lauren, Christian Dior, Tom Ford, GAP and American Eagle.

She also works for Victoria's Secret, having appeared in the 2010, 2011, 2013, 2014, 2015, 2016, 2017, and 2018 Victoria's Secret Fashion Show, as well as the 2011 Christmas commercial and the 2012 Valentine's Day commercial alongside Candice Swanepoel and Adriana Lima. She was scheduled to walk the 2012 Victoria's Secret Fashion Show, but fell and severely sprained her ankle during rehearsals. Her outfits for that year were given to Behati Prinsloo and Shanina Shaik. In the 2013 show, because of what happened, the Victoria's Secret producers gave Lais the opportunity to open the Birds of Paradise segment.

She became a Victoria's Secret Angel in 2015. On 1 November 2017, Ribeiro was chosen to wear the "Champagne Nights Fantasy Bra" for the 2017 Victoria's Secret Fashion Show held in Shanghai, China on 28 November 2017. The $2 million bra, named the "Champagne Nights Fantasy Bra", was created by Mouawad. The bra and its matching belt is handset with 6,000 yellow diamonds, yellow sapphires, and blue topaz in 18 karat gold.

Personal life
Ribeiro has a son, born on 17 May 2008. In 2014, she began dating American basketball player Jared Homan. They have since broken up, and in September 2018, she began dating NBA player Joakim Noah. A year later they became engaged. On 13 July 2022, Ribeiro and Noah were married in Trancoso in her native country Brazil.

References

External links
 
 
 Victoria's Secret

1989 births
Afro-Brazilian people
Afro-Brazilian female models
Afro-Brazilian women
Brazilian female models
Brazilian people of Portuguese descent
Living people
People from Teresina
Victoria's Secret Angels
Women Management models